Thin Ice is a single British television thriller, written by Tom Needham and directed by Ian White, that first broadcast on BBC1 on 4 December 2000. Thin Ice focuses on the character of Dr. Graham Moss (Nicholas Lyndhurst), a shady General Practitioner using his services as a practising doctor to issue fake sick notes and excess medication, who gets pulled into taking part in a bank robbery by one of his patients, gangland boss Violet Jerome (Geraldine McEwan).

The film was commissioned as one of eleven new dramas unveiled by the BBC for their Autumn/Winter season in 2000. Considered as a potential pilot for an ongoing series, the character of Moss was likened to Harold Shipman, with Guardian writer Mark Lawson describing him as "the greatest Charlatan since Crippin." The film attracted an audience of 5.68 million viewers.

Reception
Mark Lawson of The Guardian gave the film a mixed review, writing; "There is much to enjoy in Thin Ice. The morbid jokes, such as a dead man's mobile ringing as Moss begins the autopsy, serves as an eerie reminder of the Paddington rail disaster. There is another level, however, at which Thin Ice is pure rubbish. The increasingly ludicrous plot unwinds like a strange morphine dream. Thin Ice never quite knows whether it is an absurd romp or a darker meditation on the psychosis of a corrupt doctor. What is not in dispute is that it is well-timed."

Cast
 Nicholas Lyndhurst as Dr. Graham Moss
 Geraldine McEwan as Mrs. Violet Jerome
 Tim Dantay as DI Grover
 Raquel Cassidy as DS Beckett
 Sian Webber as Della Jerome
 Stephen Taylor as Harvey Jerome
 Terry Bird as Neal Jerome
 Peter McNamara as Frank Jerome
 Dennis Banks as Jacko
 Inday Ba as Joo
 Philip Madoc as Headmaster
 Darren Tunstall as Robert Cutting
 Luke Newberry as Charlie
 Jonjo O'Neill as Erik

References

External links

BBC television dramas
2000 British television series debuts
2000 British television series endings
2000s British drama television series
English-language television shows